Clouded Leopard National Park is a national park in the Sepahijala Wildlife Sanctuary Tripura, India.

The National Park is 28km from the State's Capital Agartala. The nearest airport is  Maharaja Bir Bikram Airport which is 35km away.

References

External links
Tripura

National parks in Tripura
2007 establishments in Tripura
Protected areas established in 2007